Anthony Hawken (born 1948) is an English sculptor. Hawken is a figurative sculptor working bronze, marble, and stone. He is also a medal-maker, printmaker and designer of jewellery.

Hawken was born in London. He studied at the Medway College of Art and at the Royal Academy Schools. Hawken has completed sculptures of Melvyn Bragg, Nicholas Parsons and Norman Lamont and was also responsible for the oversize sculpture of footballer, Sam Bartram which stands outside the ground of Charlton Athletic, The Valley, London. In 2006 he was reported to be working on a statue of former footballer and manager, Alan Curbishley.

References 

1948 births
Living people
Alumni of the Royal Academy Schools
Sculptors from London
English male sculptors